Fullview Garden is a Home Ownership Scheme and Private Sector Participation Scheme court located at the south of Siu Sai Wan Road in Siu Sai Wan, Hong Kong Island, Hong Kong near Siu Sai Wan Promenade, Cheerful Garden, Kai Tsui Court and Siu Sai Wan Estate. Formerly the site of intelligence gathering centre established by British Armed Force until the 1980s, it was jointly developed by the Hong Kong Housing Authority and Chevalier Group and has a total of eleven residential blocks built between 1993 and 1994.

Houses

Demographics
According to the 2016 by-census, Fullview Garden had a population of 9,402. The median age was 49.4 and the majority of residents (96.3 per cent) were of Chinese ethnicity. The average household size was 3 people. The median monthly household income of all households (i.e. including both economically active and inactive households) was HK$35,000.

Politics
Fullview Garden is located in King Yee constituency of the Eastern District Council. It was formerly represented by Tsang Yan-ying, who was elected in the 2019 elections until May 2021.

Education
Fullview Garden is in Primary One Admission (POA) School Net 16. Within the school net are multiple aided schools (operated independently but funded with government money) and two government schools: Shau Kei Wan Government Primary School and Aldrich Bay Government Primary School.

See also

Public housing estates in Chai Wan and Siu Sai Wan

References

Siu Sai Wan
Home Ownership Scheme
Private Sector Participation Scheme
Residential buildings completed in 1993
Residential buildings completed in 1994
1994 establishments in Hong Kong